is a Japanese ski mountaineer and telemark skier. He started telemark skiing at the age of 25.

Selected results 
 2007: 4th, Asian Championship, individual
 2012: 3rd, Asian Championship, individual

References

External links 
  
 Ken Fujikawa, Skimountaineering.org
 Fujikawa's blog 

1974 births
Living people
Japanese male ski mountaineers
Japanese telemark skiers
Sportspeople from Hokkaido